Wang Jun (王军, born 20 August 1963) is a Chinese former basketball player who competed in the 1984 Summer Olympics.

References

1963 births
Living people
Chinese women's basketball players
Basketball players from Shandong
Basketball players at the 1984 Summer Olympics
Medalists at the 1984 Summer Olympics
Olympic basketball players of China
Olympic bronze medalists for China
Olympic medalists in basketball
Basketball players at the 1986 Asian Games
Asian Games medalists in basketball
Asian Games gold medalists for China
Medalists at the 1986 Asian Games